Calcinus is a genus of hermit crabs in the family Diogenidae, containing the following species:

Calcinus albengai Poupin & Lemaitre, 2003
Calcinus anani Poupin & McLaughlin, 1998
Calcinus argus Wooster, 1984
Calcinus californiensis Bouvier, 1898
Calcinus chilensis (H. Milne Edwards, 1836)
Calcinus dapsiles Mogan, 1989
Calcinus elegans (H. Milne-Edwards, 1836)
Calcinus explorator Boone, 1930
Calcinus gaimardii (H. Milne-Edwards, 1848)
Calcinus gouti Poupin, 1997
Calcinus guamensis Wooster, 1984
Calcinus haigae Wooster, 1984
Calcinus hakahau Poupin & McLaughlin, 1998
Calcinus hazletti Haig & McLaughlin, 1984
Calcinus imperialis Whitelegge, 1901
Calcinus inconspicuus Morgan, 1991
Calcinus isabellae Poupin, 1997
Calcinus kurozumii Asakura & Tachikawa, 2000
Calcinus laevimanus (Randall, 1840)
Calcinus latens (Randall, 1840)
Calcinus laurentae Haig & McLaughlin, 1984
Calcinus lineapropodus Morgan & Forest, 1991
Calcinus mclaughlinae Poupin & Bouchard, 2006
Calcinus minutus Buitendijk, 1937
Calcinus morgani Rahayu & Forest, 1999
Calcinus nitidus Heller, 1865
Calcinus obscurus Stimpson, 1859
Calcinus orchidae Poupin, 1997
Calcinus paradoxus Bouvier, 1922
Calcinus pascuensis Haig, 1974
Calcinus pulcher Forest, 1958
Calcinus revi Poupin & McLaughlin, 1998
Calcinus rosaceus Heller, 1861
Calcinus seurati Forest, 1951
Calcinus sirius Morgan, 1991
Calcinus spicatus Forest, 1951
Calcinus talismani A. Milne-Edwards & Bouvier, 1892
Calcinus tibicen (Herbst, 1791)
Calcinus tropdiomanus Lewinsohn, 1981
Calcinus tubularis (Linnaeus, 1767)
Calcinus urabaensis Campos & Lemaitre, 1994
Calcinus vachoni Forest, 1958
Calcinus vanninii Gherardi & McLaughlin, 1994
Calcinus verrillii (Rathbun, 1901)

References

Diogenidae